Through the Years is a compilation album by the progressive rock band Jethro Tull. It is something of a retrospective; with songs from many different periods in the band's history. It is not a greatest hits album; as it has many songs not on such albums (Such as "Quizz Kid", "Still Loving You Tonight" and "Beastie".) It has material spanning all over the band's existence, from their first album to Roots to Branches. The liner notes contain a short history of Jethro Tull, starting humorously with the question "Didn't Jethro Tull die of a drug overdose?"

Track listing

 "Living in the Past (live)" - 5:03
 "Wind Up" - 6:04
 "Warchild" - 4:33
 "Dharma for One" (Instrumental) - 4:11
 "Acres Wild" - 3:22
 "Budapest" - 10:00
 "The Whistler" - 3:30
 "We Used to Know" - 3:55
 "Beastie" - 3:57
 "Locomotive Breath (Live)" - 5:36
 "Rare and Precious Chain" - 3:34
 "Quizz Kid" - 5:08
 "Still Loving You Tonight" - 4:30

The track "Living in the Past" is not listed as live, but is in fact taken from the live album A Little Light Music (1992).

References

Jethro Tull (band) compilation albums
1998 compilation albums